Franco Albini (17 October 1905 – 1 November 1977) was an Italian Neo-Rationalist architect, designer and university instructor in design. 

A native of Robbiate, near Milan, Albini obtained his degree in architecture at Politecnico di Milano University in 1929 and began his professional career working for Gio Ponti. He started displaying his works at the Milan Triennale, and in 1930 he opened his own practice. 

Through his creations, the modern furniture design merged the Italian traditional artisanship with the new forms of modernism.  In his creations, he used raw, inexpensive materials. He exploited the very skilled Italian craftsmanship. This also meant an elegant design based on a minimalist aesthetic.

One of his first successful works in 1939 was a radio, encased in glass, so to show its internal components.

In 1928 Albini designed the now-iconic "Albini Desk", combining steel, glass and wood with a striking minimalistic balance, and introduced by Knoll in 1949.  In 1950 he designed the famous and fashionable "Margherita" and "Gala" chairs, made of woven cane. In 1952 he created the "Fiorenza" armchair for Arflex; in 1955 the "Luisa" chair, for which he was awarded the Compasso d'Oro; in 1956 the "Rocking chaise" for Poggi.

In the 1960s he worked on industrial design as well as important architectural projects. In 1961 he designed the Rome Rinascente building. Three years later he designed with Franca Helg and Bob Noorda the Milan Metro Line 1 subway stations, and from 1969 also Milan Metro Line 2 subway stations. In 1964 the television set he created for Brionvega was displayed at the Milan Triennial XIII. In the same year, he created various lamps for Arteluce.

Albini worked for companies including Brionvega, Cassina, Arflex, Arteluce and Poggi.

He was also an architect and interior designer. Among others, in 1945 he created the Zanini Fur Shop located in Milan.  As writer and editor, from 1945 to 1946 he worked for the Italian magazine Casabella. In the 1950s and 1960s he taught interior design at the Venice School of Architecture (Università Iuav di Venezia). From 1963 to 1977 he taught design at Milan Polytechnic (Politecnico di Milano).

In 1971 he was appointed an Honorary Royal Designer for Industry (RDI) by the Royal Society for Arts (RSA) in London.

Albini obtained three Compasso d'Oro awards, the most prestigious Italian design prize.

Publications

Sherer, Daniel. "Rationalism and Paradox in Franco Albini's and Franca Helg's Architecture and Design, 1934–1977," in D. Sherer, Aldo Colonetti, eds. Franco Albini and Franca Helg Design (Milan, 2009), 9–38.
Leet, Stephen. Franco Albini, Architecture and Design, 1934–1977 (Princeton Architectural Press, New York, 1990).
Jones, Kay Bea. Suspending Modernity: The Architecture of Franco Albini, Surrey: Ashgate, 2014

References

External links

 World Wide Arts Resources
 Franco Albini Foundation

1905 births
1977 deaths
20th-century Italian architects
Architects from Milan
Italian industrial designers
Casabella editors
Italian urban planners
Modernist architects from Italy
Olivetti people
People from the Province of Lecco
Polytechnic University of Milan alumni
Italian furniture designers
Designers
Compasso d'Oro Award recipients
Royal Designers for Industry